The 2011 Seguros Bolívar Open San José was a professional tennis tournament played on hard courts. It was the first edition of the tournament which is part of the 2011 ATP Challenger Tour. It took place in San José, Costa Rica between 14 and 20 March 2011.

ATP entrants

Seeds

 Rankings are as of March 7, 2011.

Other entrants
The following players received wildcards into the singles main draw:
  Andrea Collarini
  Juan Sebastián Gómez
  Ignaci Roca
  Eduardo Struvay

The following players received entry from the qualifying draw:
  Felipe Escobar
  Edgar López
  Rodrigo Grilli
  Esteban Vargas

The following player received entry as a lucky loser:
  Enrique Naranjo

Champions

Singles

 Giovanni Lapentti def.  Igor Kunitsyn,  7–5, 6–3

Doubles

 Juan Sebastián Cabal /  Robert Farah def.  Luis Díaz Barriga /  Santiago González, 6–3, 6–3

External links
Official Site
ITF Search
ATP official site

Seguros Bolivar Open San Jose
Hard court tennis tournaments